Khairullah (born 3 February 1999) is an Afghan cricketer. He made his first-class debut for Speen Ghar Region in the 2017–18 Ahmad Shah Abdali 4-day Tournament on 26 October 2017.

References

External links
 

1999 births
Living people
Afghan cricketers
Spin Ghar Tigers cricketers
Place of birth missing (living people)